In physics and chemistry, the law of conservation of mass or principle of mass conservation states that for any system closed to all transfers of matter and energy, the mass of the system must remain constant over time, as the system's mass cannot change, so the quantity can neither be added nor be removed. Therefore, the quantity of mass is conserved over time.

The law implies that mass can neither be created nor destroyed, although it may be rearranged in space, or the entities associated with it may be changed in form. For example, in chemical reactions, the mass of the chemical components before the reaction is equal to the mass of the components after the reaction. Thus, during any chemical reaction and low-energy thermodynamic processes in an isolated system, the total mass of the reactants, or starting materials, must be equal to the mass of the products.

The concept of mass conservation is widely used in many fields such as chemistry, mechanics, and fluid dynamics. Historically, mass conservation in chemical reactions was primarily demonstrated by Jean Rey (in 1630) and later rediscovered by Antoine Lavoisier in the late 18th century. The formulation of this law was of crucial importance in the progress from alchemy to the modern natural science of chemistry.

In reality, the conservation of mass only holds approximately and is considered part of a series of assumptions in classical mechanics. The law has to be modified to comply with the laws of quantum mechanics and special relativity under the principle of mass-energy equivalence, which states that energy and mass form one conserved quantity. For very energetic systems the conservation of mass only is shown not to hold, as is the case in nuclear reactions and particle-antiparticle annihilation in particle physics.

Mass is also not generally conserved in open systems. Such is the case when various forms of energy and matter are allowed into, or out of, the system. However, unless radioactivity or nuclear reactions are involved, the amount of energy escaping (or entering) such systems as heat, mechanical work, or electromagnetic radiation is usually too small to be measured as a decrease (or increase) in the mass of the system.

For systems that include large gravitational fields, general relativity has to be taken into account; thus mass-energy conservation becomes a more complex concept, subject to different definitions, and neither mass nor energy is as strictly and simply conserved as is the case in special relativity.

Formulation and examples 

The interpretation of the continuity equation for mass is the following: For a given closed surface in the system, the change, over any time interval, of the mass enclosed by the surface is equal to the mass that traverses the surface during that time interval: positive if the matter goes in and negative if the matter goes out. For the whole isolated system, this condition implies that the total mass , the sum of the masses of all components in the system, does not change over time, i.e.  where  is the differential that defines the integral over the whole volume of the system.

The continuity equation for the mass is part of the Euler equations of fluid dynamics. Many other convection–diffusion equations describe the conservation and flow of mass and matter in a given system.

In chemistry, the calculation of the amount of reactant and products in a chemical reaction, or stoichiometry, is founded on the principle of conservation of mass. The principle implies that during a chemical reaction the total mass of the reactants is equal to the total mass of the products. For example, in the following reaction

where one molecule of methane and two oxygen molecules  are converted into one molecule of carbon dioxide and two of water. The number of molecules resulting from the reaction can be derived from the principle of conservation of mass, as initially four hydrogen atoms, 4 oxygen atoms and one carbon atom are present (as well as in the final state); thus the number water molecules produced must be exactly two per molecule of carbon dioxide produced.

Many engineering problems are solved by following the mass distribution of a given system over time; this methodology is known as mass balance.

History

As early as 520 BCE, Jain philosophy, a non-creationist philosophy based on the teachings of Mahavira, stated that the universe and its constituents such as matter cannot be destroyed or created. The Jain text Tattvarthasutra (2nd century CE) states that a substance is permanent, but its modes are characterised by creation and destruction.

An important idea in ancient Greek philosophy was that "Nothing comes from nothing", so that what exists now has always existed: no new matter can come into existence where there was none before. An explicit statement of this, along with the further principle that nothing can pass away into nothing, is found in Empedocles (c.4th century BCE): "For it is impossible for anything to come to be from what is not, and it cannot be brought about or heard of that what is should be utterly destroyed."

A further principle of conservation was stated by Epicurus around the 3rd century BCE, who wrote in describing the nature of the Universe that "the totality of things was always such as it is now, and always will be".

Discoveries in chemistry
By the 18th century the principle of conservation of mass during chemical reactions was widely used and was an important assumption during experiments, even before a definition was formally established, as can be seen in the works of Joseph Black, Henry Cavendish, and Jean Rey. The first to outline the principle was Mikhail Lomonosov in 1756. He may have demonstrated it by experiments and certainly had discussed the principle in 1748 in correspondence with Leonhard Euler, though his claim on the subject is sometimes challenged. According to the Soviet physicist Yakov Dorfman:The universal law was formulated by Lomonosov on the basis of general philosophical materialistic considerations, it was never questioned or tested by him, but on the contrary, served him as a solid starting position in all research throughout his life.  A more refined series of experiments were later carried out by Antoine Lavoisier who expressed his conclusion in 1773 and popularized the principle of conservation of mass. The demonstrations of the principle disproved the then popular phlogiston theory that said that mass could be gained or lost in combustion and heat processes.

The conservation of mass was obscure for millennia because of the buoyancy effect of the Earth's atmosphere on the weight of gases. For example, a piece of wood weighs less after burning; this seemed to suggest that some of its mass disappears, or is transformed or lost. This was not disproved until careful experiments were performed in which chemical reactions such as rusting were allowed to take place in sealed glass ampoules; it was found that the chemical reaction did not change the weight of the sealed container and its contents. Weighing of gases using scales was not possible until the invention of the vacuum pump in the 17th century.

Once understood, the conservation of mass was of great importance in progressing from alchemy to modern chemistry. Once early chemists realized that chemical substances never disappeared but were only transformed into other substances with the same weight, these scientists could for the first time embark on quantitative studies of the transformations of substances. The idea of mass conservation plus a surmise that certain "elemental substances" also could not be transformed into others by chemical reactions, in turn led to an understanding of chemical elements, as well as the idea that all chemical processes and transformations (such as burning and metabolic reactions) are reactions between invariant amounts or weights of these chemical elements.

Following the pioneering work of Lavoisier, the exhaustive experiments of Jean Stas supported the consistency of this law in chemical reactions, even though they were carried out with other intentions. His research indicated that in certain reactions the loss or gain could not have been more than 2 to 4 parts in 100,000. The difference in the accuracy aimed at and attained by Lavoisier on the one hand, and by Morley and Stas on the other, is enormous.

Modern physics 
The law of conservation of mass was challenged with the advent of special relativity. In one of the Annus Mirabilis papers of Albert Einstein in 1905, he suggested an equivalence between mass and energy. This theory implied several assertions, like the idea that internal energy of a system could contribute to the mass of the whole system, or that mass could be converted into electromagnetic radiation. However, as Max Planck pointed out, a change in mass as a result of extraction or addition of chemical energy, as predicted by Einstein's theory, is so small that it could not be measured with the available instruments and could not be presented as a test of special relativity. Einstein speculated that the energies associated with newly discovered radioactivity were significant enough, compared with the mass of systems producing them, to enable their change of mass to be measured, once the energy of the reaction had been removed from the system. This later indeed proved to be possible, although it was eventually to be the first artificial nuclear transmutation reaction in 1932, demonstrated by Cockcroft and Walton, that proved the first successful test of Einstein's theory regarding mass loss with energy gain.

The law of conservation of mass and the analogous law of conservation of energy were finally generalized and unified into the principle of mass–energy equivalence, described by Albert Einstein's famous formula  . Special relativity also redefines the concept of mass and energy, which can be used interchangeably and are defined relative to the frame of reference. Several quantities had to be defined for consistency, such as the rest mass of a particle (mass in the rest frame of the particle) and the relativistic mass (in another frame). The latter term is usually less frequently used.

Generalization

Special relativity 

In special relativity, the conservation of mass does not apply if the system is open and energy escapes. However, it does continue to apply to totally closed (isolated) systems. If energy cannot escape a system, its mass cannot decrease. In relativity theory, so long as any type of energy is retained within a system, this energy exhibits mass.

Also, mass must be differentiated from matter, since matter may not be perfectly conserved in isolated systems, even though mass is always conserved in such systems. However, matter is so nearly conserved in chemistry that violations of matter conservation were not measured until the nuclear age, and the assumption of matter conservation remains an important practical concept in most systems in chemistry and other studies that do not involve the high energies typical of radioactivity and nuclear reactions.

The mass associated with chemical amounts of energy is too small to measure 
The change in mass of certain kinds of open systems where atoms or massive particles are not allowed to escape, but other types of energy (such as light or heat) are allowed to enter, escape or be merged, went unnoticed during the 19th century, because the change in mass associated with addition or loss of small quantities of thermal or radiant energy in chemical reactions is very small. (In theory, mass would not change at all for experiments conducted in isolated systems where heat and work were not allowed in or out.)

Mass conservation remains correct if energy is not lost 
The conservation of relativistic mass implies the viewpoint of a single observer (or the view from a single inertial frame) since changing inertial frames may result in a change of the total energy (relativistic energy) for systems, and this quantity determines the relativistic mass.

The principle that the mass of a system of particles must be equal to the sum of their rest masses, even though true in classical physics, may be false in special relativity. The reason that rest masses cannot be simply added is that this does not take into account other forms of energy, such as kinetic and potential energy, and massless particles such as photons, all of which may (or may not) affect the total mass of systems.

For moving massive particles in a system, examining the rest masses of the various particles also amounts to introducing many different inertial observation frames (which is prohibited if total system energy and momentum are to be conserved), and also when in the rest frame of one particle, this procedure ignores the momenta of other particles, which affect the system mass if the other particles are in motion in this frame.

For the special type of mass called invariant mass, changing the inertial frame of observation for a whole closed system has no effect on the measure of invariant mass of the system, which remains both conserved and invariant (unchanging), even for different observers who view the entire system. Invariant mass is a system combination of energy and momentum, which is invariant for any observer, because in any inertial frame, the energies and momenta of the various particles always add to the same quantity (the momentum may be negative, so the addition amounts to a subtraction). The invariant mass is the relativistic mass of the system when viewed in the center of momentum frame. It is the minimum mass which a system may exhibit, as viewed from all possible inertial frames.

The conservation of both relativistic and invariant mass applies even to systems of particles created by pair production, where energy for new particles may come from kinetic energy of other particles, or from one or more photons as part of a system that includes other particles besides a photon. Again, neither the relativistic nor the invariant mass of totally closed (that is, isolated) systems changes when new particles are created. However, different inertial observers will disagree on the value of this conserved mass, if it is the relativistic mass (i.e., relativistic mass is conserved but not invariant). However, all observers agree on the value of the conserved mass if the mass being measured is the invariant mass (i.e., invariant mass is both conserved and invariant).

The mass-energy equivalence formula gives a different prediction in non-isolated systems, since if energy is allowed to escape a system, both relativistic mass and invariant mass will escape also. In this case, the mass-energy equivalence formula predicts that the change in mass of a system is associated with the change in its energy due to energy being added or subtracted:  This form involving changes was the form in which this famous equation was originally presented by Einstein. In this sense, mass changes in any system are explained simply if the mass of the energy added or removed from the system, are taken into account.

The formula implies that bound systems have an invariant mass (rest mass for the system) less than the sum of their parts, if the binding energy has been allowed to escape the system after the system has been bound. This may happen by converting system potential energy into some other kind of active energy, such as kinetic energy or photons, which easily escape a bound system. The difference in system masses, called a mass defect, is a measure of the binding energy in bound systems – in other words, the energy needed to break the system apart. The greater the mass defect, the larger the binding energy. The binding energy (which itself has mass) must be released (as light or heat) when the parts combine to form the bound system, and this is the reason the mass of the bound system decreases when the energy leaves the system. The total invariant mass is actually conserved, when the mass of the binding energy that has escaped, is taken into account.

General relativity 
In general relativity, the total invariant mass of photons in an expanding volume of space will decrease, due to the red shift of such an expansion. The conservation of both mass and energy therefore depends on various corrections made to energy in the theory, due to the changing gravitational potential energy of such systems

See also
 Charge conservation
 Conservation law
 Fick's laws of diffusion
 Law of definite proportions
 Law of multiple proportions

References

Mass
Conservation laws